Waiting for Snow in Havana: Confessions of a Cuban Boy is a 2003 book by Carlos Eire and winner of the National Book Award for Nonfiction.  The book is autobiographical, about the author's experiences as part of Operation Peter Pan.

Author
Professor Eire, who received his PhD from Yale University in 1979, specializes in the social, intellectual, religious, and cultural history of late medieval and early modern Europe. He has a strong focus on both the Protestant and Catholic Reformations; the history of popular piety; and the history of death. He is the author of War Against the Idols: The Reformation of Worship From Erasmus to Calvin (1986); From Madrid to Purgatory: The Art and Craft of Dying in Sixteenth Century Spain (1995); and co-author of Jews, Christians, Muslims: An Introduction to Monotheistic Religions (1997). He has also ventured into the twentieth century and the Cuban Revolution in Waiting for Snow in Havana (2003), which won the National Book Award in Nonfiction, 2003.

Reception 
Waiting for Snow in Havana was chosen as the Philadelphia One Book, by Mayor of Philadelphia John F. Street, who said:

"In 1962, Carlos Eire was one of 14,000 children airlifted out of Cuba-exiled from his family, his country, and his own childhood by the revolution.  The memories of Carlos's life in Havana, cut short when he was just eleven years old, are the heart of this stunning, evocative, and unforgettable memoir. Waiting for Snow in Havana is both an exorcism and an ode to a paradise lost.  For the Cuba of Carlos's youth-with its lizards and turquoise seas and sun-drenched siestas- becomes an island of condemnation once a cigar-smoking guerrilla named Fidel Castro ousts President Batista on January 1, 1959.  Suddenly the music in the streets sounds like gunfire.  Christmas is made illegal, political dissent leads to imprisonment, and too many of Carlos's friends are leaving Cuba for a place as far away and unthinkable as the United States.  Carlos will end up there, too, and fulfill his mother's dreams by becoming a modern American man- even if his soul remains in the country he left behind. Narrated with the urgency of a confession, Waiting for Snow in Havana is a eulogy for a native land and a loving testament to the collective spirit of Cubans everywhere."

Awards and honors
2003 National Book Award for Nonfiction
2007 One Book, One Philadelphia

References

2003 non-fiction books
Free Press (publisher) books
National Book Award for Nonfiction winning works
Cuban-American literature